The 1943–44 Irish Cup was the 64th edition of the premier knock-out cup competition in Northern Irish football. 

Belfast Celtic won the tournament for the 7th time and 2nd consecutive year, defeating Linfield 3–1 in the final at Windsor Park.

Results

First round

|}

Quarter-finals

|}

Semi-finals

|}

Replay

|}

Final

References

External links
 Northern Ireland Cup Finals. Rec.Sport.Soccer Statistics Foundation (RSSSF)

Irish Cup seasons
1943–44 domestic association football cups
1943–44 in Northern Ireland association football